Doanesburgh is an extinct locality in Putnam County, in the U.S. state of New York.

A post office called Doanesburgh was established in 1839, and remained in operation until 1855. The community was named after Benjamin Doane, an early settler.

See also
 Old Southeast Church (Brewster, New York)

References

Ghost towns in New York (state)
Landforms of Putnam County, New York